Katarzyna Piekart (born 5 March 1986) is a Polish athlete who competes in disability athletics in the T/F46 category. She won the gold medal for the Javelin throw at the 2012 Paralympic Games for her category with a new World Record.

References

External links
 

World record holders in Paralympic athletics
Living people
1986 births
Polish female javelin throwers
Medalists at the 2012 Summer Paralympics
Athletes (track and field) at the 2012 Summer Paralympics
Paralympic athletes of Poland
Paralympic gold medalists for Poland
People from Siedlce
Paralympic medalists in athletics (track and field)
21st-century Polish women